Love Education is a 2017 Chinese-Taiwanese drama film directed and co-written by Sylvia Chang. It stars Chang, Tian Zhuangzhuang, Lang Yueting, Song Ningfeng, and Wu Yanshu. It focuses on three generations of women in Henan Province.

The film received critical acclaim, with many praising the screenplay and direction, as well as the performances of Wu, Tian, and Chang.

Plot
Love Education is a story of family and love, involving three women of different ages. Weiwei, nearly 30, has reached the age where she is able to marry. Her love life is in danger of her past, with her work causing troubles with her mother, Huiying, unable to understand it fully. Huiying is a middle-aged teacher who is about to retire, and takes on all arrangements after her mother's death, as she and her husband, Xiaoping, depend on each other but the couple suffer from emotional miscommunication. Nana, the 90-year-old grandma who has lived alone for decades, finds her life interrupted Huiying's sudden visit, and brings up the history of a bittersweet love affair. Through the three generations of women who share different views on life and love, they must find a way to connect as they meet together.

Cast
 Sylvia Chang as Qiu Huiying	 
 Tian Zhuangzhuang as Yin Xiaoping
 Lang Yueting as Weiwei 
 Wu Yanshu as Nana
 Song Ning as A-da 
 Geng Le as Lu Mingwei 
 Sitar Tan as Zhu Yin 
 Rene Liu
 Li Xuejian
 Wang Zhiwen

Production
The city and rural scenes were filmed in Zhengzhou and Luoyang, respectively.

Awards and nominations

References

External links

2017 films
2017 drama films
Chinese drama films
Taiwanese drama films
Films directed by Sylvia Chang
Films set in Henan
Films shot in Henan
2010s Mandarin-language films